The 1998–99 Eastern European Hockey League season, was the fourth season of the Eastern European Hockey League. 12 teams participated in the league, and HK Sokol Kiev of Ukraine won the championship.

First round

Second round

Champions round

Qualification round

Playoffs

External links
Season on hockeyarchives.info

2
Eastern European Hockey League seasons